Gregorio de Montalvo Oliver, O.P. (1529 – 11 December 1592) was a Roman Catholic prelate who served as Bishop of Cuzco (1587–1592) and Bishop of Yucatán (1580–1581).

Biography
He was born in Coca, Segovia, Spain, and ordained a priest in the Order of Preachers. On 15 December 1580, he was appointed during the papacy of Pope Gregory XIII as Bishop of Yucatán. In 1581, he was consecrated bishop. On 16 November 1587, he was appointed during the papacy of Pope Sixtus V as Bishop of Cuzco. He served as Bishop of Cuzco until his death, on 11 December 1592.

References

External links and additional sources
 (for Chronology of Bishops) 
 (for Chronology of Bishops) 
 (for Chronology of Bishops) 
 (for Chronology of Bishops) 

16th-century Roman Catholic bishops in Mexico
Bishops appointed by Pope Gregory XIII
Bishops appointed by Pope Sixtus V
1529 births
1592 deaths
Dominican bishops
16th-century Roman Catholic bishops in Peru
Roman Catholic bishops of Cusco